"Paris sera toujours Paris" (English: Paris will always be Paris) is a song by Maurice Chevalier released in 1939.

Development and composition

The song was written by Albert Willemetz. and was released in 1939.

Zaz version

Charts

References

1939 songs
Songs with music by Casimir Oberfeld
Songs with lyrics by Albert Willemetz
Maurice Chevalier songs
Songs about Paris
Songs about World War II